Atelopus is a large genus of Bufonidae, commonly known as harlequin frogs or toads, from Central and South America, ranging as far north as Costa Rica and as far south as Bolivia. Atelopus species are small, generally brightly colored, and diurnal. Most species are associated with mid-to-high elevation streams.

This genus has been greatly affected by amphibian declines, with about 70% of species now considered endangered or extinct. While threatened by habitat loss, pollution, and introduced species, the primary cause of these declines appears to be the chytrid fungus Batrachochytrium dendrobatidis.

Almost 40% of the described species in the genus are considered possibly extinct; this is raised to 45% when data deficient species are added; this number may be even higher, given that the genus contains many undescribed species that could also be extinct, and many of the species considered critically endangered but extant may have gone extinct after the last surveys that detected them, or could go extinct in the future.  For example, there are 32 known Atelopus species (including half a dozen undescribed) in Ecuador. One of these is data deficient (its status is unclear), two are endangered and the remaining are critically endangered. Almost half the Ecuador species have not been recorded in a decade or more and are likely extinct. In some species conservationists have established captive colonies as a safeguard. However, of 80 species that had not been seen since the 1950s, 32 have been sighted in the 21st Century, albeit at dangerously low population numbers.  Among the Atelopus species that have been rediscovered decades after their last sighting have been A. arsyescue, A. mindoensis, A. bomolochos, A. ignescens, A. balios, A. longirostris, A. subornatus and A. varius.  The mechanism whereby these species survived extinction remains to be discovered.

New Atelopus species are discovered with some regularity, and many new species have been described in the last decade. Among others, a new subspecies, popularly dubbed the purple fluorescent frog, was discovered in 2007 by scientists Paul Ouboter and Jan Mol during a follow-up survey of the Nassau plateau in Suriname. Leeanne Alonso from Conservation International, the organisation that led the expedition, said this frog may be threatened by illegal gold mining. It was described as a new subspecies of Atelopus hoogmoedi (itself considered a subspecies of A. spumarius by some), named A. h. nassaui in 2012. Two new species were also described in 2020: A. manauensis and A. moropukaqumir, both of which are highly threatened by the chytrid fungus and habitat destruction. Another new species, A. frontizero, was described in 2021.

Species

References

External links
Atelopus.com - Fighting to Survive
Ranas Arlequines
Bufonidae. Amphibiaweb

 
Amphibians of Central America
Amphibians of South America
Amphibian genera
Taxa named by Gabriel Bibron
Taxa named by André Marie Constant Duméril